Coahuilix is a genus of small freshwater snails that have an operculum, aquatic gastropod mollusks in the family Cochliopidae.

Species
Species within the genus Coahuilix include:
Coahuilix hubbsi Taylor, 1966 Coahuilix de hubbs snail
Coahuilix landyei Hershler, 1985

References

 Hershler R. & Thompson F.G. (1992) A review of the aquatic gastropod subfamily Cochliopinae (Prosobranchia: Hydrobiidae). Malacological Review suppl. 5: 1-140.

 
Cochliopidae
Taxonomy articles created by Polbot